Cheongsimhwan (lit. "clear mind pill"), also called uhwang-cheongsimhwan and cheongsimwon, is a pill formulated with thirty odd herbs including bezoars, ginseng, and Chinese yam root, used to treat various symptoms such as numb limbs and fit of apoplexy, epilepsy, etc. in traditional Korean medicine.

References 

Traditional Korean medicine
Drugs